Arno Marais (born 19 April 1984), is a South African actor. He is best known for his roles in the popular serials Stroomop, Die Boekklub and Reconnect.

Personal life
He was born on 19 April 1984 in Bloemfontein, South Africa. His mother is Corrie Viviers.

Career
In 2009, he played the role as IT specialist 'Benjamin le Roux' in the popular soap opera Isidingo where his episode aired on 20 November. In 2016, he appeared in the kykNET drama series Die Boekklub and played the role 'Herman Mouton'. In late 2016, he had a two-year hiatus from Isidingo. During this period, he joined the cast of television serial Sokhulu & Partners and played the role as 'Adv. Nick Edwards'. Then he appeared on the serial 7de Laan in a recurring role. Then in 2017, he returned to Isidingo.

Accident
On 28 July 2010, he was involved in a fatal car accident in which Kobus Venter, a teenager has died. Marais was severely injured and remained in a coma for four weeks at Steve Biko Academic Hospital in Pretoria. According to hospital sources, he had some swelling on the brain during coma as well as bad internal bleeding. He left lung was crushed, so used a respirator. He spent six weeks in hospital. In 2012, he made a brief first appearance in the Pretoria Regional Court regarding the accident.

Controversy
In 2018, he posted a number of Tweets attacking Muslims and Tweeted some questionable views about Islam.

Television serials
 Die Boekklub - Season 1 and 2 as Herman Mouton
 Eish! Saan - Season 1 as Celebrity Prankster
 Getroud met Rugby: Die Sepie - Seasons 3, 4, 5 as Thinus
 Isidingo - Season 1 as Benjamin le Roux
 Sokhulu & Partners - Season 3 as Adv. Nick Edwards

Filmography

References

External links
 

Living people
South African male television actors
1984 births
South African male film actors
People from Bloemfontein